Ashen is a village and civil parish in Essex, England. The village lies to the south of the River Stour, which here forms the county boundary with Suffolk. The village is in the district of Braintree and the parliamentary constituency of Saffron Walden. The parish is part of the Bumpsteads and Upper Colne parish cluster.

According to the 2011 census it had a population of 323.

References

External links
 
 Ashen Church on Essex Churches website
 

Villages in Essex
Braintree District